Caustis pentandra, known as the thick twist rush is a widely distributed grass like plant found in many parts of Australia. It may grow to 2 metres tall, often seen in dry open forest, or moist heathland. Stems are a shiny pale green. The specific epithet pentandra is derived from the ancient Greek language, referring to five stamens.  This species first appeared in scientific literature in the year 1810, in the Prodromus Florae Novae Hollandiae, authored by the prolific Scottish botanist Robert Brown.

References 

pentandra
Flora of New South Wales
Flora of Victoria (Australia)
Flora of Queensland
Flora of Western Australia
Flora of South Australia
Flora of Tasmania
Plants described in 1810
Taxa named by Robert Brown (botanist, born 1773)